Xerasia grisescens is a species of fruitworm beetle in the family Byturidae. It is found in North America.

References

Further reading

 

Byturidae
Articles created by Qbugbot
Beetles described in 1882